Banabuiú is a municipality in the state of Ceará, in Brazil.

References

Municipalities in Ceará